Egirdira is a monospecific genus of ray-finned fish belonging to the subfamily Leuciscinae, its only species is Egirdira nigra, or the yag baligi, is a species of freshwater fish in the family Cyprinidae.
It is found only in Turkey, in tributaries of Lake Egridir in Central Anatolia. It is considered critically endangered (CR).

Sources

References

Pseudophoxinus
Endemic fauna of Turkey
Fish described in 1972
Taxonomy articles created by Polbot